Thambetochen is an extinct genus of moa-nalo duck. It contains two species, the Maui Nui moa-nalo (T. chauliodous) and the smaller O'ahu moa-nalo (T. xanion).
 
 
The former was found on Maui and Molokai on Hawaii, the latter was found on Oahu. These birds were large, flightless ducks, with robust legs but small wings, which had evolved in isolation, on islands without terrestrial mammals. Their beaks had tooth-like lamellae and their diet was plants which they digested through hindgut fermentation. These birds were likely driven to extinction when the islands were colonised by Polynesians.

References

Anatidae
Holocene extinctions
Extinct flightless birds
Extinct birds of Hawaii
Late Quaternary prehistoric birds
Endemic fauna of Hawaii
Bird genera
Fossil taxa described in 1976